Giovanni Adam Roman (born 4 May 1961 in Świdnica) is a Polish politician. He was elected to the Sejm on 25 September 2005, getting 4373 votes in 2 Wałbrzych district as a candidate from the Law and Justice list.

See also
Members of Polish Sejm 2005-2007

External links
Giovanni Roman - parliamentary page - includes declarations of interest, voting record, and transcripts of speeches.

1961 births
Living people
People from Świdnica
Members of the Polish Sejm 2005–2007
Law and Justice politicians